Rose Kemp (born in Carlisle on 11 December 1984) is an English singer and guitarist who performs in a variety of musical genres. She is the daughter of Maddy Prior and Rick Kemp of the folk-rock band Steeleye Span.

Singing career 
Kemp began her singing career performing live with Steeleye Span while still in her teenage years. This led to her being invited to contribute vocals to several albums by various folk artists. In 1996 she sang with The Carnival Band on their Carols at Christmas CD. In 2002 Park Records released the a cappella folk album Bib and Tuck by 'Maddy Prior And The Girls', a trio composed of Maddy Prior, Rose Kemp and Abbie Lathe. Kemp wrote, and sang lead vocals on, several of the album's tracks. Her first single, "The Milkman Makes Eggs" was an airplay favorite.

Kemp's first solo album Glance, an acoustic pop record, was released on Park Records in 2003. She subsequently toured with The Oyster Band as part of The Big Session, appearing with them across the UK and Europe.

2004 saw a considerable change in the direction of Rose's musical output. She recorded a mini-album, originally entitled "The Free To Be Me EP," but later renamed simply "Mini-Album," at Warehouse Studios in Oxford with members of The Fourers. The new recording was very much a rock record, with Kemp playing electric guitar and taking charge of the arrangements and production for the first time in her career.

Kemp signed an album deal with One Little Indian Records in July 2005, and recorded her second full-length album, "A Hand Full of Hurricanes," at studios in Bristol and Cardiff with producer Charlie Francis. This album was released in February 2007. After a large amount of time spent touring the UK and Europe in support of the record, she began recording in summer 2007 at State of Art studios, Bristol. Her third studio album, Unholy Majesty was produced by Chris Sheldon and was released on 1 September 2007. The following two years saw Rose making appearances at the acclaimed Roadburn Festival (Tilburg, Netherlands) and Supersonic Festival (Birmingham, UK), as well as a headline tour and appearances supporting Porcupine Tree. She released a fourth album, Golden Shroud, in 2010, and promoted it on a tour with Mono and Grails.

In December 2010, a Rose Kemp cover version of the Cardiacs song "Wind and Rains is Cold" - recorded in collaboration with electronic musician Rarg - appeared on Leader Of The Starry Skies: A Tribute To Tim Smith, Songbook 1, a fundraising compilation album to benefit the hospitalised Cardiacs leader Tim Smith. Kemp has also been known to cover another Cardiacs song, "Fairy Mary Mag," in concert as an a capella version.

Other projects

Jeremy Smoking Jacket
Kemp also performs with SJ Esau as part of the experimental, often improvisational pop trio Jeremy Smoking Jacket. The group recorded an EP entitled "Now We Are Dead (and Other Stories)" which was released jointly by Enormous Corpse and Fact Fans in August 2005; Max Milton left the group in October 2006, but Kemp and Sam continued as a duo, recording a live session for Huw Stephens' show on BBC Radio 1 in November 2006. They have performed at the Glastonbury Festival and at Tate Britain. The pair are currently working on their first full-length album.

VILNA
In February 2006 Kemp joined an instrumental Post-rock band called Snakes on a Plane as their lead guitarist. Originally a five piece, second guitarist Matt Williams aka Team Brick left and the band changed their name to VILNA, after a piece of music by the French band Weidorje. The four piece, whose other members are Joe Garcia, James King and Alex Bertram-Powell, gradually moved into more progressive/doom metal territory. Although VILNA ceased to be in 2007, Joe Garcia and James King would subsequently play in Rose's band and played on the 2008 album "Unholy Majesty." In 2009, King, Garcia and Bertram-Powell reunited to form the progressive psych band ANTA.

Stones Barn
Kemp, with Maddy Prior and Abbie Lathe, co-facilitates singing workshops at Stones Barn in Cumbria.

Discography 
 Carols at Christmas (LP/1996/Park Records PRKCD45) - as Rosie Kemp singing with The Carnival Band
 Bib and Tuck (LP/2002/Park Records) - as 'Maddy Prior And The Girls' with Maddy Prior and Abbie Lathe.
 Glance (LP/2003/Park Records) - as 'Rose Kemp'.
 Mini-Album (EP/2004/Self Release) - as 'Rose Kemp'.
 Now We Are Dead (and Other Stories) (EP/2005/Enormous Corpse-Fact Fans) - as 'Jeremy Smoking Jacket' with SJ Esau and Max Milton.
 Violence (7"vinyl single/2006/One Little Indian Records) - as 'Rose Kemp'
 A Hand Full of Hurricanes (LP/2007/One Little Indian Records) - as 'Rose Kemp'
 Ammonia track on Idolum by Ufomammut (Supernatural Cat Records) - Ufomammut feat. Rose Kemp
 Heavy Black Snow collaboration track with HUMANFLY on Brainwash Records compilation
 Unholy Majesty (LP/2008/One Little Indian Records) - as 'Rose Kemp'
 Unholy Majesty (VINYL LP/Aurora Borealis Records) - as 'Rose Kemp'
 Golden Shroud (LP/2010) - as 'Rose Kemp'

External links
 Rose Kemp Official Website
 Rose Kemp page on MySpace
 Rose Kemp page on the One Little Indian website
 Jeremy Smoking Jacket page on MySpace
 Aurora Borealis Records

1984 births
Living people
English women guitarists
English guitarists
Women rock singers
People from Carlisle, Cumbria
21st-century English women singers
21st-century English singers
21st-century British guitarists
Musicians from Bristol
21st-century women guitarists